Steven R. Nickol was a member of the Pennsylvania House of Representatives representing the 193rd State House district, which then included areas of Adams and York counties. He was a member of the Republican Party.

Nickol is a 1968 graduate of the York County Day School. In 1972, he graduated from Franklin and Marshall College.

He was initially elected to the Pennsylvania House in 1990, and has been re-elected in every election since. Prior to serving in the legislature himself, Nickol was Chief of Staff to Pennsylvania State Senator Ralph Hess.

Nickol announced his intention to retire at the end of his term in 2009 and currently is employed by the Pennsylvania State Education Association.

References

External links
Pennsylvania House of Representatives -  Steven Nickol official PA House website
Pennsylvania House Republican Caucus - Representative  Steven Nickol official Party website
Biography, voting record, and interest group ratings at Project Vote Smart

Living people
Republican Party members of the Pennsylvania House of Representatives
Politicians from Auburn, New York
People from York County, Pennsylvania
Franklin & Marshall College alumni
1950 births
Place of birth missing (living people)